Taif University is located in Al Hawiyah, Ta’if, Saudi Arabia. It was established in 2004. The University is one of three created by TU. The university is a member of the Association of Arab Universities and offers undergraduate and graduate programs in various fields of study.

Programs 
Taif University offers a wide range of undergraduate and graduate programs, including arts, science, engineering, business, medicine, dentistry, pharmacy, and law. The university has a total of 16 faculties, which include the College of Science, the College of Engineering, the College of Medicine, the College of Dentistry, and the College of Pharmacy.

External links
Taif University Official website
 Saudi Ministry for education home
Biotech collaboration with Saudi Arabia

Universities and colleges in Saudi Arabia
Educational institutions established in 2004
2004 establishments in Saudi Arabia
Public universities and colleges in Saudi Arabia